There were two 11th Independent Mixed Brigades in the Imperial Japanese Army.

The original 11th IMB
The order of battle of the first 11th Independent Mixed Brigade in July 1937:

11th Independent Mixed Brigade
 11th Independent Infantry Regiment
 12th Independent Infantry Regiment
 11th Independent Cavalry Company
 11th Independent Field Artillery Regiment
 12th Independent Mountain Gun Regiment
 11th Independent Engineer Company
 11th Independent Transport Company

This unit was involved in the Operation Chahar and Battle of Taiyuan in 1937, but soon after was recalled to Manchukuo where it was formed into the IJA 26th Division.

The 11th IMB (1939-1945)
The order of battle of the second 11th Independent Mixed Brigade, which was formed in 1939, for garrison duties in China:

11th Independent Mixed Brigade 
 46th Infantry Battalion
 47th Infantry Battalion
 48th Infantry Battalion
 49th Infantry Battalion
 50th Infantry Battalion
 11th IMB Artillery Battalion
 11th IMB Engineer Company
 11th IMB Light Antiaircraft Company
 11th IMB Signal Unit

The brigade was in the Battle of West Henan–North Hubei.

See also
Independent Mixed Brigades (Imperial Japanese Army)

References

Independent Mixed Brigades (Imperial Japanese Army)
Military units and formations established in 1936
Military units and formations disestablished in 1937
Military units and formations established in 1939
Military units and formations disestablished in 1945
1936 establishments in Japan
1937 disestablishments in Japan
1939 establishments in Japan
1945 disestablishments in Japan